The Via Rápida 1 or VR1 (Fast Road 1 in English) is the first motorway in Madeira. Since April 2017, there is another motorway in the island called VR2. Construction started in 1989 completed in 2005.

With 44 km it goes from  Ribeira Brava to Porto do Caniçal, providing a fast connection between Funchal and the Madeira International Airport. This motorway is also known as Cota 200

Junctions

There are 27 Junctions and 30 tunnels in total.

References

Roads in Portugal
2000 establishments in Portugal
Transport in Madeira